Pseudocrossocheilus liuchengensis is a species of cyprinid fish endemic to China.

References

Fish described in 1987
Pseudocrossocheilus